Hemmatabad (also Romanized as Hemmatābād) is a village in Miandorud-e Kuchak Rural District, in the Central District of Sari County, Mazandaran Province, Iran. At the 2006 census, its population was 910, in 247 families.

References 

Populated places in Sari County